Prehistoric Women is a British fantasy adventure film in DeLuxe Color and CinemaScope, first released in the US in 1967. It was eventually released in the UK 18 months later under the title Slave Girls, where it was trimmed by 17 minutes and issued as the supporting feature to The Devil Rides Out. The film stars Martine Beswick as the main antagonist and stage actor Michael Latimer. Steven Berkoff features in a small role at the end.

Plot
 
David Marchant (Michael Latimer), a British explorer, along with Colonel Hammond (Robert Raglan) and a guide are pursuing a wounded leopard on an African safari. David decides to find the beast and put it out of its misery before nightfall.

Walking some way, he passes various trees with a picture of a white rhino, but ignores them. The leopard attacks him and he shoots it dead, whereupon David is ambushed and captured by a primitive tribe. They accuse him of disturbing the spirit of the white rhinoceros and take him to their leader's temple. As the high priest makes his decision, David notices a large, ancient stone statue of a white rhino and realises this is what the tribe worship. Interested, David reaches out to touch it. Just as he is about to be killed for his trespassing and disturbing the spirits, David touches the statue and there is a flash of lightning that opens a giant crack in the cave wall. David flees through it.

David finds himself in a lush paradise jungle within a large valley. He hears a noise, and encounters a terrified fair-haired woman (Edina Ronay). David tries to help her, but the woman runs off. David follows her, but they are both attacked by dark-haired women. David is escorted with them to their village, while the fair-haired woman is bound and taken with them. As they reach the outskirts, David is astounded to discover another white rhino statue.

Entering the settlement, David finds that the fair-haired women serve the dark-haired women, who themselves are ruled by the beautiful, dark-haired Queen Kari (Martine Beswick), who immediately takes an interest in David and chooses him as her mate, but he is appalled by her cruelty and spurns her advances. Angered, Kari orders her guards to throw David into a windowless cell. Coming to his senses, David finds the same woman he encountered earlier, revealing her name as Saria. When David asks if Saria's people have ever fought back, she replies that Kari is protected by the Devils, the guardians shielding the people from the "cruel world outside". In return, one of the fair-haired women must be taken as a thanksgiving for protection.

David is moved to where the other men are, in a cave and now living in fear of Kari. At mealtime, an elder tells David of how it all began; their ancestors moved into the area and hunted the white rhino to extinction. This done, they erected a false image to convince others that they still existed. In doing so, they offended their gods, and the legend of the white rhino was born. The elder explains they were sent a tribe of "dark people", who came to this land seeking protection and enslaved them. The only protection Saria's people had was the lie that the white rhino protected them, until a slave girl escaped and told them of the lie. As a result, the men were enslaved and the slave girl was made their queen, Kari. The tribe will only become bonded by the spirit again when the false idol is destroyed.

As time passes, a "Devil" chooses Saria as the next bride of the white rhino. David urges the men to join forces with the fair-haired women against the dark people. Escaping, the men disrupt the ceremony as the rhino-masked "Devil" is about to take Saria. David jumps the "Devil" and unmasks him as an African man. David frees Saria as more rhino-masked "Devils" emerge from the jungle, but the men and allied women pursue them, unaware they do not know the jungle as well as they do. A battle breaks out between the two tribes in the jungle. Kari sets out through the battle to kill David. Suddenly, there is an almighty roar and both tribes see a white rhino. Despite Kari telling the tribes it is their god, the beast charges and impales the false idol, Kari. The creature begins to drive out the "Devils" and disappears into the jungle.

David takes Kari's white rhino brooch and offers it to Saria, who then refuses it, saying that the "Devils" will not be returning. She goes on to say that the legend is partly fulfilled and she heads over to the white rhino statue. David tells her that he will not leave her, despite Saria telling him that her world is not his. David confesses his love for Saria, but she moves away and tells David that her love for him will always remain. She leaves David alone in the rain, along with the statue of the white rhino. As if hypnotised, David touches the white rhino's horn as lightning strikes.

In an instant, David is back in the high priest's temple just as they are about to proclaim judgment over him. Suddenly the white rhino statue begins to break and crumble to pieces. The priest joyfully announces that the legend of the white rhino is true and that they are free at last. The priest then orders the destruction of the "false idol's temple", whilst David discreetly leaves and joins the guide, who has been waiting for him.

Once back at the camp, David wonders whether it really was a dream or he had really traveled back in time to reunite a lost African tribe and end a million-year-old legend. As he cleans himself, he discovers the white rhino brooch in his pocket. David is then asked to greet some people from London. To his amazement, one of the guests is the spitting image of Saria. The guest then introduces herself as Sarah. Clutching the brooch, David shakes her hand.

Cast
 Martine Beswick as Queen Kari
 Michael Latimer as David Marchent
 Carol White as Gido
 Steven Berkoff as John
 Edina Ronay as Saria/Sarah
 Stephanie Randall as Amyak
 Alexandra Stevenson as Luri
 Yvonne Horner as first Amazon
 Sydney Bromley as Ullo
 Frank Hayden as Arja
 Robert Raglan as Colonel Hammond
 Mary Hignett as Mrs. Hammond
 Louis Mahoney as head boy
 Bari Jonson as the High Priest
 Danny Daniels as Jakara

Background
As a cost savings measure, Hammer used nearly all the sets and the Carl Toms-designed costumes left over from the film One Million Years B.C. (1966), which had starred Raquel Welch and featured Martine Beswick. Further films by Hammer which traded heavily on the appeal of scantily-clad cave girls were When Dinosaurs Ruled the Earth (1970) and Creatures the World Forgot (1971)..

Shooting took place at Elstree Studios from 10 January to 22 February 1966 while One Million Years B.C. was still in post-production.

Reception

Box office
According to Fox records, the double feature of the film and The Devil Rides Out needed to earn $1,450,000 in rentals to break even and made $1,265,000, meaning they made a loss.

Critical response
“…[Beswick] was cast as Queen Kari in the film Prehistoric Women, a sort of follow up to the successful One Million Years BC. As the seductive and deadly leader of a tribe of lost amazons, Beswick had one of the great roles of a lifetime. Unfortunately, the production was plagued by indifferent direction, a low budget, and the fact that it was following up a gargantuan worldwide box office hit ...”-- Film Fatales: Women in Espionage Films and Television 1962-1973
"An eccentric and unloved Hammer film that uses a blondes vs. brunettes scenario."-- The Hammer Vault
"Idiotic Hammer Film in which the Great White Hunter stumbles into a lost Amazon civilization where blondes have been enslaved by brunettes. Honest! Nevertheless it has developed a cult following due to Beswick’s commanding, sensual performance as the tribe’s leader." -- Leonard Maltin's 2010 Movie Guide

Legacy
Hammer reportedly viewed the film as one of their worst productions, delaying the film's premier in Great Britain by nearly two years and by re-titling the movie to Slave Girls.

Beswick claims that she "...particularly enjoyed doing Prehistoric Women because even though it was such a B-film, the dialogue gave me some meaty diatribes against men, and, although I never considered myself a feminist, it was immensely satisfying to verbalize." Beswick also credited Carreras with encouraging her to be as wicked and cruel as possible, a role she said was greeted by mutual laughter between takes.

References

External links

 
 
 
 
  
 Hammer Glamour website

1967 films
1960s fantasy adventure films
British fantasy adventure films
Films shot at Associated British Studios
Films directed by Michael Carreras
Hammer Film Productions films
Films set in prehistory
British remakes of American films
Films set in pre-colonial sub-Saharan Africa
1960s English-language films
1960s British films